Valery Pavlovich Alekseyev (sometimes spelled as Alexeev) (22 August 1929¨, Moscow – 7 November 1991) was a Russian anthropologist, director of the Institute of Archaeology in Moscow (1987–1991) and member of the Soviet Academy of Sciences, exceptionally without having been a member of the Communist Party.

Alekseyev proposed Homo rudolfensis in 1986.  In 2006 Russian Academy of Sciences established the Valery Alekseyev award for the outstanding achievements in anthropology and archaeology.

Alekseyev died suddenly from thromboses in Moscow on 7 November 1991, aged 62.

The award winning popular science book on human evolution Who Asked the First Question? Origins of Human Choral Singing, Intelligence, Language and Speech (2006) is dedicated to the memory of Alekseyev and his lifelong friend, Georgian anthropologist Malkhaz Abdushelishvili.

Scientific activity
V.P. Alekseev (together with A.I. Pershits) is the author of the famous textbook for universities “The History of Primitive Society”, which has already passed 6 editions (the last one in 2007).

Struggling with sociological theories, the scientist recognized the race existence and its connection with ethnicity. In the division of humans into races, he was traditional and distinguished Caucasians, Negroids and Mongoloids; moreover, he connected Caucasians with Negroids.

In the characteristic of the first, V.P. Alekseev has seen the Neanderthal addition. The peculiarity of the Mongoloids was the influence by synanthropes. He divided the Caucasians into northern (Baltic) and southern (Mediterranean, Armenoid and Indo-Afghan). In addition to the "pure" races, Alekseev singled out "mixed" or "transitional" races, for example, the Ural race.

Bibliography
Alekseyev has published 20 books and some 500 articles.

 Историческая антропология и этногенез (Historical anthropology and ethnogenesis) (1989)
 География человеческих рас (Geography of the human race) (1974)
 The Origin of the Human Race. Progress Publishers (1986), .
 Палеоантропология земного шара и формирование человеческих рас (Global paleoanthropology and the formation of the human races)
 Происхождение народов Восточной Европы (Origin of the peoples of Eastern Europe)
 Происхождение народов Кавказа (Origin of the peoples of the Caucasus) (1974)

External links
The Alexeev Manuscript, 1991 lectures held in Harvard.
biography (ido.edu.ru)

1929 births
1991 deaths
Academics from Moscow
Paleoanthropologists
Russian anthropologists
Full Members of the USSR Academy of Sciences
20th-century anthropologists